"One Step at a Time" is a song written by Hugh Ashley and performed by Brenda Lee.  The song reached #15 on the country chart and #43 on the Billboard Hot 100 in 1957.

The song was arranged by Jack Pleis and Al Caiola played guitar on the song.

References

1957 songs
1957 singles
Brenda Lee songs
Decca Records singles